Adlumia fungosa is a species in the Papaveraceae that is commonly known as the Allegheny vine, climbing fumitory, or mountain fringe. It is a herbaceous, creeping, flowering plant and is closely related to the Fumitory genus, Fumaria.

Adlumia fungosa is a biennial climbing plant with very slender stems. The leaves are several times pinnately divided, prehensile, and feathery in texture. The white or pinkish flowers grow in large clusters and appear in summer. The plant grows on wet and wooded slopes, and is native to North America, particularly the Allegheny Mountains area. It is a threatened or endangered species throughout its range in northeastern North America, where it has not been completely extirpated. This vine can grow up to twelve feet in length on wooded and rocky slopes.

The species name fungosa means 'spongy' in Latin.

References

External links

Adlumia fungosa. Connecticut Botanical Society.

Fumarioideae
Flora of the Northeastern United States
Flora of the Great Lakes region (North America)
Flora of the Southeastern United States
Flora of the United States
Flora of Eastern Canada